A list of films produced in Italy in 1985 (see 1985 in film):

References

Footnotes

Sources

External links
Italian films of 1985 at the Internet Movie Database

1985
Italin
Films